Esko is an unincorporated community and census-designated place (CDP) in Thomson Township, Carlton County, Minnesota, United States. As of the 2010 census, its population was 1,869.

The community is between Cloquet and Duluth at the junction of Interstate 35 and County Road 1 (Thomson Road). Esko is six miles east of Cloquet and 16 miles southwest of Duluth.

Carlton County Road 61 serves as a main route in the community.

Most Esko residents are descendants of Finnish, Norwegian and Swedish immigrants who settled the area during the early 20th century. The nearby community of Thomson also has a large Scandinavian presence.

Most students in kindergarten through 12th grade attend classes at Winterquist Elementary School and Lincoln High School of Esko. Esko is well known for its successful high school sports teams.

Demographics

History
Esko was settled by immigrants between the 1870s and early 1900s. The majority of settlers were Finnish and their culture is reflected in the community's traditions. In 1919, a small store was built at the corner of what is now Thomson Road and County 61 by a man named Alex Esko. It became known as "Esko's Corner." The Lincoln School was built nearby in 1920 and residents began to move into the area. The name was shortened to "Esko" in 1935.

The book Esko's Corner, published by the Esko Historical Society, gives a detailed account of Esko's history. The Historical Society also runs a small museum in the heart of the community.

References

Census-designated places in Carlton County, Minnesota
Census-designated places in Minnesota